Gro Steinsland (born 1945) is a Norwegian scholar of medieval studies and history of religion and since August 2009 has been the Scientific Director of the Centre for Advanced Study at the Norwegian Academy of Science and Letters. 

Steinsland has most recently been a professor in the Institute for Linguistic and Nordic Studies at the University of Oslo, where she was also a member of the international interdepartmental Centre for Studies in the Viking Age and Nordic Middle Ages from its founding in 1993 until its dissolution. She has also taught in the Institute for Religious Studies at the University of Tromsø and has held guest faculty positions at Linacre College, Oxford University and at the University of Bonn. In 2007/08 she led the international interdisciplinary research group in "The Power of the Ruler and the Ideology of Rulership in Nordic Culture 800-1200" at the Centre for Advanced Study of the Norwegian Academy of Science and Letters, and since 1 August 2009 has been its Scientific Director.

Steinsland specialises in pre-Christian religion, the associated Old Norse texts and mythology and the conversion of Scandinavia. At both Oslo and Tromsø, she made Norse religion a main subject within the history of religion programme. She is a member of the group for theology and religious studies in the Academy of Science and Letters. As a historian of religion, her publications take Norse paganism seriously and present it in a non-traditional light as having been still strong and vital when it encountered Christianity. In 2005 she published a wideranging introductory book, Norrøn religion (Norse religion), which presents the subject from the perspective of myth and praxis. In her influential 1989 PhD dissertation, Det hellige bryllup og norrøn kongeideologi: en analyse av hierogami-myten i Skírnismál, Ynglingatal, Háleygjatal og Hyndluljód (the sacred marriage and Norse ideology of kingship: an analysis of the myth of the hieros gamos in Skírnismál, Ynglingatal, Háleygjatal and Hyndluljóð), she reinterpreted the sacred marriage between a god and a giantess as a power myth legitimising rulership rather than a fertility myth; she specialises in the interpretation of written sources but has also made extensive use of archaeology and frequently takes an interdisciplinary approach. She has also emphasised the female aspect of pre-Christian religion, particularly in her 1997 book Eros og død i norrøne myter (Eros and death in Norse myths), in which she contrasts the sexualisation of death in, for example, references to drowning as being embraced by the sea goddess Rán with the post-conversion view of female sexuality as shameful.

Steinsland has also readily written newspaper opinion articles, for example in 2000 taking the position that Thor Heyerdahl's Odin expedition to Azerbaijan was inspired by a conjectural "charade" orchestrated by Snorri Sturluson.

Selected publications
 Det hellige bryllup og norrøn kongeideologi: en analyse av hierogami-myten i Skírnismál, Ynglingatal, Háleygjatal og Hyndluljód. Oslo: Solum, 1991. . Doctoral dissertation, University of Oslo, 1989. 
 (with Preben Meulengracht Sørensen) Før kristendommen: digtning og livssyn i vikingetiden Copenhagen: Gyldendal, 1990. 
 (with Preben Meulengracht Sørensen) Menneske og makter i vikingenes verden Oslo: Universitetsforlaget, 1994. 
 Eros og død i norrøne myter. Oslo: Universitetsforlaget, 1997. 
 (with Preben Meulengracht Sørensen) Voluspå, Gjendiktning og kommentar. Oslo: Pax, 1999. 
 Den hellige kongen; om religion og herskermakt fra vikingtid til middelalder. Oslo: Pax, 2000. 
 (with Magnus Rindal) Heilage stader i Norge. Oslo: Det Norske samlaget, 2001. 
 Norrøn religion: Myter, riter, samfunn. Oslo: Pax, 2005.  
 (Ed.) Words and Objects: Towards a Dialogue Between Archaeology and History of Religion. (Conference proceedings) Instituttet for sammenlignende kulturforskning Serie B-Skrifter 71. Oslo: Norwegian University Press / Oxford/New York: Oxford University, 1984. 
 (Ed.) Voluspå, og andre norrøne helligtekster. Verdens hellige skrifter. Oslo: De norske Bokklubbene, 2003. 
 (Ed.) Draumkvedet, og tekster fra norrøn middelalder. Verdens hellige skrifter. Oslo: De norske Bokklubbene, 2004.

References

External links
 Gro Steinsland at Institute for Linguistic and Nordic Studies, University of Oslo 
 Gro Steinsland at OCLC Worldcat
 Gro Steinsland at Worldwide Universities Network: Medieval Studies

1945 births
Living people
Academic staff of the University of Oslo
Academic staff of the University of Tromsø
Old Norse studies scholars
Members of the Norwegian Academy of Science and Letters
Norwegian women academics
Writers on Germanic paganism